Castle Lake is a glacial tarn in the Ruby Mountains of Elko County, Nevada, United States. It is within the Ruby Mountains Wilderness, which is administered by the Ruby Mountains Ranger District of the Humboldt-Toiyabe National Forest. It is one of the sources of Kleckner Creek, which after exiting the mountains merges with other streams to form the South Fork of the Humboldt River.

References

Ruby Mountains
Lakes of Nevada
Lakes of Elko County, Nevada
Lakes of the Great Basin
Humboldt–Toiyabe National Forest